Dactyladenia dinklagei is a species of plant in the family Chrysobalanaceae. It is endemic to Ivory Coast, Ghana and Liberia. Its natural habitats are wet evergreen forests. It is threatened by habitat loss due to mining activities, logging and commercial planting.

References

dinklagei
Flora of Ghana
Flora of Ivory Coast
Flora of Liberia
Plants described in 1899